Punta Secca, locally nicknamed ’A Sicca, is a small southern Italian fishing village and hamlet (frazione) of Santa Croce Camerina, a municipality in the Province of Ragusa, Sicily. In 2011 it had a population of 226.

History

The ancient city of Kaukanai is located a few hundred metres from Punta Secca.

The village, anciently settled, was named ʿAyn al-Qasab during the Arab domination of Sicily.

Geography
Punta Secca lies on the Mediterranean Coast, between Punta Braccetto, Kaukana and Casuzze, and next to Marina di Ragusa. It is 5 km from Santa Croce Camerina, 16 from Scoglitti, 18 from Donnalucata, 27 from Scicli, 32 from Modica, 23 from Vittoria and Comiso, and 27 from Ragusa.

Main sights
The village has a lighthouse, a small port and an old watchtower, the Torre Scalambri. The tower dates from the 16th century and is next to the harbour.

In popular culture
The town has gained renown as the fictional "Marinella" in the RAI television series Inspector Montalbano, adapted from Andrea Camilleri's "Inspector Montalbano" books. Many scenes with Montalbano's fictional home are set in a house that backs onto the beach from where he swims each day.

Gallery

See also
Capo Scaramia Lighthouse

References

External links

Panoramic photos of Punta Secca

Frazioni of the Province of Ragusa